I've Fallen for You is a 2007 Philippine romantic film. This is the first solo film of Gerald Anderson and Kim Chiu after Sana Maulit Muli ended on April 20 5 months later and they were also from First Day High, which premeired on September 27, 2006 a year later.

Plot
The list of UPCAT passers is up and it says ‘Alex Reyes’ passed. This good news makes a boy and a girl jump. The host of the anime costume play announces that ‘Alex Reyes’ wins the grand prize for the night. From the stairs, a girl and a boy rush to claim the prize. There are two ‘Alex Reyes’; this spells disaster.

Alex Boy (Gerald Anderson) returns to the Philippines from Singapore with his mom, Tessa (Chin Chin Gutierrez). His father’s job in a multinational company brought them to live in many parts of the world and he really never had something he can call home. He can’t seem to focus on anything; he easily starts a hobby but never really finishes it. With the news of his parents breaking-up, Alex Boy has to do everything to achieve what he has always wanted; to live in one place as a family together.

Alex Girl (Kim Chiu) has set goals for herself and her family. She has to pass UP and get a job later to help her crumbling family. The inn-restaurant her family owns isn’t doing well and it doesn’t help that her parents, Jonathan (Albert Martinez) and Vangie (Lotlot de Leon), are always fighting. She has no time for anything but to find ways to earn. Perhaps, money would bring the peace in her family that she has always wanted.

Alex Boy finds in Alex Girl the perfect partner for a tandem cycling competition he wants to join. In desperate need of funding for her studies, the prize of fifty thousand pesos convinces Alex Girl to team up with her annoying namesake. But everything Alex Girl has is talent; she lacks the proper techniques needed to win. As Alex Boy teaches her the techniques she needs, he learns from this driven girl the virtue of responsibility. In turn, Alex Boy makes Alex Girl see what she misses in her life; having fun.

Two young hearts find company and comfort in each other. As they decide to nurture their young love, fate challenges them to leap over the greatest challenge their love story would ever face; the story of their own families’ past.

Cast

Main cast
 Kim Chiu as Alex Tamayo Reyes
 Gerald Anderson as Alex Tamano Reyes

Supporting cast
 Albert Martinez as Jonathan Reyes
 Lotlot de Leon as Vangie Tamayo Reyes
 Chin Chin Gutierrez as Tessa Tamano Reyes
 Cathy Gonzaga as Samantha
 Ketchup Eusebio
 Amy Perez as Ninang Beth
 Lloyd Samartino as Randy Reyes
 Miles Ocampo as Angel
 Alex Gonzaga as Samantha

Reception
Despite having strong marketing and wide distribution, I've Fallen for You failed to open at number 1 in the Philippine box-office with sales of P13,988,751 (63 screens), far behind Resident Evil: Extinction with P17,680,244 (51 screens). 'I've Fallen for You' eventually grossed a grand total of P35,917,446.

Chiu and Anderson were announced as the "Most Popular Loveteam" by the Guillermo Mendoza Memorial Scholarship Foundation.

See also
 List of highest-grossing films in the Philippines

References

External links
 I've Fallen For You at ABS-CBN.com
 

2007 films
Star Cinema films
2000s Tagalog-language films
2000s romance films
Philippine romance films
2000s English-language films